Bo Persson is a male former international table tennis player for Sweden.

Table tennis career
He won a bronze medal at the 1967 World Table Tennis Championships in the Swaythling Cup (men's team event), a feat which he repeated eight years later at the 1975 World Table Tennis Championships.

In between the two bronze medals he recorded his greatest achievement by winning a gold medal in the Swaythling Cup (men's team event) at the 1973 World Table Tennis Championships as part of the Sweden team that contained Anders Johansson, Kjell Johansson, Stellan Bengtsson and Ingemar Wikström.

He also won four gold medals in the team event at the European Table Tennis Championships and played wearing spectacles. He later became a coach.

See also
 List of table tennis players
 List of World Table Tennis Championships medalists

References

Swedish male table tennis players
World Table Tennis Championships medalists